Skipalong Rosenbloom is a 1951 American Western film directed by Sam Newfield and written by Eddie Forman and Dean Riesner. Starring Max Rosenbloom, Max Baer, Jackie Coogan, Fuzzy Knight, Hillary Brooke and Jacqueline Fontaine, it was released on April 30, 1951, by United Artists.

Synopsis
A western town is terrorized by a gang of outlaws and trick a newcomer into becoming sheriff.

Cast 
 Max Rosenbloom as Skipalong Rosenbloom 
 Max Baer as Butcher Baer
 Jackie Coogan as Buck Lovelace
 Fuzzy Knight as Sneaky Pete	
 Hillary Brooke as Square Deal Sal
 Jacqueline Fontaine as Caroline Witherspoon
 Raymond Hatton as Granpappy Tex Rosenbloom
 Ray Walker as TV Announcer
 Al Shaw as Al 
 Sam Lee as Sam 
 Joseph J. Greene as Judge Bean 
 Dewey Robinson as Honest John
 Whitey Haupt as The Pecos Kid
 Carl Mathews as Fake Indian
 Artie Ortego as Henchman Artie

References

External links 
 

1951 films
1951 Western (genre) films
American Western (genre) films
American black-and-white films
1950s English-language films
Films directed by Sam Newfield
United Artists films
1950s American films